John Walter Siegal (May 15, 1918 – May 27, 2015) was an American football end/defensive end in the National Football League. He played five seasons for the Chicago Bears (1939–1943). He was born in Larksville, Pennsylvania. At the time of his death, Siegal was the oldest living Bears player. He died on May 27, 2015 at the age of 97 in his hometown of Harveys Lake, Pennsylvania.

References

External links

1918 births
2015 deaths
People from Larksville, Pennsylvania
American football defensive ends
American football wide receivers
Columbia Lions football players
Chicago Bears players
Players of American football from Pennsylvania
United States Navy personnel of World War II
Northwestern University alumni